Nicklas David Holm (born 8 March 1981 in Copenhagen) is a Danish Olympic Star class sailor. Together with Claus Olesen, he finished 9th in the 2004 Summer Olympics – Star class event.

References

External links
 
 

1981 births
Living people
Danish male sailors (sport)
Olympic sailors of Denmark
Sailors at the 2004 Summer Olympics – Star
Star class sailors
Sportspeople from Copenhagen
21st-century Danish people